Acanthogylippus is a monotypic genus of gylippid camel spiders, first described by Aleksei Birula in 1913. Its single species, Acanthogylippus judaicus is distributed in Israel.

References 

Solifugae
Arachnid genera
Monotypic arachnid genera